The Cikta is a breed of domestic sheep from Hungary.  In the 18th century, this breed was brought to Hungary by German settlers.  This breed grows wool but is primarily raised for meat.  The Cikta belong in the Mountain Group of sheep breeds.

Characteristics 
The Cikta is white (unicolored).  Rams have horns and ewes are polled (hornless).  Typically, horns are small or knob-like.  Generally, this breed is adaptable to extreme climates.  The ears are erect.

At maturity, rams weigh  and ewes weigh . Ewes have an average 1.1 lambs per litter.

References 

Sheep breeds
Sheep breeds originating in Hungary